Adinobotrys atropurpureus, synonym Callerya atropurpurea, is a species of tree in the family Fabaceae. The tree can be found throughout Southeast Asia: from Myanmar to Java.

Symbolism 
In Thailand it is the provincial tree of Nakhon Si Thammarat Province.

References

Faboideae
Flora of Cambodia
Flora of Java
Flora of Laos
Flora of Malaya
Flora of Myanmar
Flora of Sumatra
Flora of Thailand
Flora of Vietnam
Plants described in 1830